Augustine Colin Macdonald (June 30, 1837 – July 16, 1919) was a Canadian merchant and political figure. He represented King's County and later King's in the House of Commons of Canada from 1873 to 1874, from 1878 to 1882, from 1883 to 1887 and from 1891 to 1900 as a Liberal-Conservative member. Macdonald served as the tenth Lieutenant Governor of Prince Edward Island from 1915 to 1919.

He was born in Panmure Island, the son of Hugh Macdonald, a Scottish immigrant, and was educated in Georgetown and Charlottetown. Macdonald married Mary Elizabeth, the daughter of John Small MacDonald, in 1865. He served as a captain in the militia. He represented 3rd Kings in the Legislative Assembly of Prince Edward Island from 1870 to 1873. He resigned his seat in 1873 to run for the federal seat. On June 2, 1915, Macdonald was named Lieutenant Governor. He died in office in 1919.

His brother Andrew Archibald served in the Senate of Canada and was also a Lieutenant Governor for the province and his brother Archibald John was a long-time member of the provincial assembly.

External links 

 Prince Edward Island Lieutenant Governors Gallery
Augustine Colin Macdonald fonds, Library and Archives Canada

1837 births
1919 deaths
People from Kings County, Prince Edward Island
Conservative Party of Canada (1867–1942) MPs
Members of the House of Commons of Canada from Prince Edward Island
Progressive Conservative Party of Prince Edward Island MLAs
Lieutenant Governors of Prince Edward Island